John Simoneaux (April 24, 1967 – January 17, 2000), Simoneaux became well known in Ruston, Louisiana, playing in the bands Blue Monday and Howard Shaft Horns, and hosting the "Tuesday Night Blues Jam" at the Sundown Tavern in Ruston with his friends backing him as the house band. Simoneaux played throughout Louisiana, toured nationally with Doug Duffey in 1998, and in 1999, performed in Switzerland and other European countries before dying in a car accident while traveling to Austin, Texas for a gig with The Roadhouse Disciples.

Simoneaux's only publicly-released music is an early studio effort with Howard Shaft on Blue Monday and the Howard Shaft Horns and was released to fans in limited quantities. His second CD was with Christopher Ames, aka "Chris Rhoads". William "Skippy" Clarke, one of John's friends/fans, was booking agent for both Chris Rhoads and Blue Monday and the Howard Shaft Horns. John, Ryan Munsey, Skippy, and Shawn Smith went to Texas to the studio that was supposedly where SRV had done some recording, where John played the electric guitar on some tracks, Ryan Munsey played bass and Smith and Clarke are both credited on one song as well. The CD by Christopher Ames as "Chris Rhoads" on Deep Blues, a blues-based Christian CD.

Biography
Simoneaux was born in Baton Rouge, Louisiana, United States, where he first learned to play guitar as a young man. He played football at Redemptorist High School, graduating in 1985. John also played in a heavy metal band, Reaper, during high school. In 1996, John earned a BFA in Classical Guitar Performance from Louisiana Tech University, and also studied classical music in Santiago de Compostela, Spain.

As soon as he looked old enough, John jammed with the musicians at Tabby Thomas's "Tabby's Blues Box" in Baton Rouge, LA. While at Louisiana Tech, he started jamming with the locals there and eventually became the leader of the house band at the Sundown Tavern in Ruston. John also started the band Blue Monday (named as a tribute to the recently deceased Stevie Ray Vaughan), and performed all across North Louisiana. John later joined with the talented group of horn players that became known as the Howard Shaft Horns, named after "getting the shaft" at a talent contest held at the Louisiana Tech's Howard Auditorium. Blue Monday and the Howard Shaft Horns having parted ways, a new band, Monday's Child, was formed (a name John hated but was too nice to make a big deal about). The band consisted of John on guitar and vocals, his friend (although 10 years younger), schoolmate, and former house band member Ryan Munsey on bass, his friend, fellow Louisiana Tech student (although 10 years his senior), student of the Tuesday Night Jams at the Sundown, and eventual former house band member Speedy Mercer, aka "Dr Speed," on drums. Once Monday's Child was ready to turn professional and go on tour, Speedy dropped out to keep his day job and was replaced by Donovan Hatcher, a longtime friend, schoolmate, and Blue Monday drummer. The three musicians moved to Austin, Texas and performed in and around Austin as the Roadhouse Disciples. They eventually toured Switzerland and nearby countries, backing Doug Duffy and also performing as the Roadhouse Disciples, without Duffy.

On June 5, 1998, in a private civil ceremony, John married fellow Louisiana Tech student Alison Bowden. The couple had a public wedding, with family and friends in attendance, in a Ruston church on January 23, 1999.

Shortly after the band's return from the Switzerland tour, John and Alison had dinner at a Chili Verde restaurant in Monroe, LA with a few friends. The next day, Simoneaux was killed in an accident on a foggy Texas road on his way back to Austin. The loss is still felt by his friends and the Ruston community.

Speedy Mercer, John's friend and former bandmate, wrote the following after Simoneaux's funeral in Baton Rouge:

"They were all there . . . the Cops and the Musicians, the Computer Geeks and the Mechanics, the Teenagers and the Geriatrics . . . All with one purpose in mind . . . to see the man who had taken center stage. With guitar pick in hand, wearing a Hawaiian shirt, his favorite blue jeans and his Converse tennis shoes he waited, impish smirk on his face, for the crowd to settle down. It was noisy in the big room. Seating for more than a hundred left standing room only . . . no . . . less, for people were left standing in the halls outside. The place was alive with talk and laughter . . . stories being told of the man, his antics, his love of his friends, family and his music. As the event began, a hush fell over the room as one-by-one people approached the front of the audience and spoke. They spoke of kindness, love and inspiration . . . of humor generosity and giving for this was John Simoneaux’s final gig . . . his wake."

God Bless
Speedy "Dr. Speed" Mercer
01/21/2000

Selected discography
 Blue Monday and the Howard Shaft Horns : Blue Monday and the Howard Shaft Horns (1997) Self produced

With Chris Rhoads
 Christopher Ames as "Chris Rhoads" on the CD Deep Blues (1998) Self produced

References

External links
 Official website

1967 births
2000 deaths
American funk guitarists
American male guitarists
American funk singers
American blues guitarists
American blues singers
Singers from Louisiana
Songwriters from Louisiana
20th-century American singers
Louisiana Tech University alumni
20th-century American guitarists
Guitarists from Louisiana
20th-century American male singers
American male songwriters